Matylda Ossadnik (17 March 1917 – 15 May 1997) was a Polish gymnast. She competed in the women's artistic team all-around event at the 1936 Summer Olympics.

References

1917 births
1997 deaths
Polish female artistic gymnasts
Olympic gymnasts of Poland
Gymnasts at the 1936 Summer Olympics
Sportspeople from Bytom